Tiruray may refer to:
The Tiruray people, a Filipino ethnic group
The Tiruray language, the language spoken by the Tiruray people